Running Wild (also known as Born Wild) is a 1995 film starring Brooke Shields, Martin Sheen and David Keith. It was written by Andrea Buck, Dee McLachlan and John Varty.

Plot
A journalist for a struggling television station travels to Africa to meet conservationist and filmmaker John Varty, who has been following a mother leopard for several years. She believes this would make an interesting story for the station's viewers. However, things don't work out as planned as one of the station's executives is trying to stop her filming idea and the unfortunate death of the mother leopard.

Main cast
Brooke Shields ... Christine Shaye
Martin Sheen ... Dan Walker
David Keith ... Jack Hutton
Norman Anstey ... Van Heerden
Dale Dicky ...  Judith
Renée Estevez ... Aimee
Greg Latter ... Stevens
John Varty ... Himself

Notes

References

External links

1990s adventure films
1995 drama films
1995 films
1990s English-language films
Films directed by Dee McLachlan